The Santa Cruz and Monterey Bay Railroad (SCMB), or Santa Cruz Branch Rail Line (SCBRL), is a historic railway running through Santa Cruz County, California. It once ran operationally from Davenport to the Watsonville Junction where it connected to the Union Pacific Coast Line. Over the years it has had many splays and connections to other local railroads over, through, and around the Santa Cruz Mountains.  It is still active today, including a connection with the Roaring Camp Railroads line that makes regular trips between Felton and the Santa Cruz Beach Boardwalk.

History
The line was constructed as the Santa Cruz Railroad between 1873–1876 and was laid with narrow gauge rail. After foreclosure, it was sold to Southern Pacific (through a subsidiary Pacific Improvement Company) who converted the line to standard gauge and operated until the actual merger into Southern Pacific on 14 May 1888. The  Aptos branch from Aptos to Loma Prieta was built as the Loma Prieta Railroad in 1883 and abandoned in 1928.

The line was extended to Davenport in 1905. Until 1940, the line connected in Santa Cruz with the former South Pacific Coast Railroad to San Jose, California as an alternative Southern Pacific Coast Line route north of Watsonville Junction. A cement kiln in Davenport provided one hundred carloads weekly of inbound coal and outbound cement. Inbound lumber and outbound refrigerator cars of locally grown Brussels sprouts, artichokes, and lettuce provided additional freight traffic. Suntan Special summer excursion trains carried 900 passengers per trip from San Francisco to the Santa Cruz Beach Boardwalk from July 1947 to September 1959. There was a railway turntable and 5-stall roundhouse in Santa Cruz, but steam locomotives were replaced by EMD GP9s in 1955. The Pajaro River bridge was damaged by the 1989 Loma Prieta earthquake. The line came under ownership of Union Pacific in 1996.

County ownership
The Santa Cruz County Regional Transportation Commission purchased the rail corridor in 2012. At that time, freight operations were contracted out to Iowa Pacific Holdings, commencing service in November 2012. In 2018, Progressive Rail, Inc. was chosen as the replacement freight operator under a 10-year contract. The Transportation Commission is studying the possibility of rehabilitating the rail line for a new commuter rail service or rebuilding the corridor for bus rapid transit. A demonstration streetcar operated over the branch in October 2021. The line sustained major damage in the 2022-2023 storms.

Route
The right of way begins at Watsonville Junction, where it interchanges with Union Pacific's Coast Line. The line features street running sections in Watsonville and Santa Cruz where trains interact directly with roadway traffic. The Santa Cruz, Big Trees and Pacific Railway operates part of its heritage railway service along SCMB tracks from the Santa Cruz Beach Boardwalk to that railroad's main line east of the Beach Street roundabout, before turning onto its own tracks at the Santa Cruz Wye towards Felton on the former South Pacific Coast Railroad mainline. After leaving Santa Cruz, the line runs parallel to California State Route 1 until Davenport, where the tracks end.

References

External links
 Rail Projects – Santa Cruz County Regional Transportation Commission

Rail lines in California